Richard Portman (April 2, 1934 – January 28, 2017) was an American sound engineer. He won an Academy Award for Best Sound and was nominated for ten more in the same category. He worked on more than 160 films between 1963 and 2004. Portman later taught at Florida State University; he died of complications after a fall.

Selected filmography
Portman won an Academy Award and was nominated for ten more:

Won
 The Deer Hunter (1978)

Nominated
 Kotch (1971)
 The Godfather (1972)
 The Candidate (1972)
 Paper Moon (1973)
 The Day of the Dolphin (1973)
 Young Frankenstein (1974)
 Funny Lady (1975)
 Coal Miner's Daughter (1980)
 On Golden Pond (1981)
 The River (1984)

References

External links

1934 births
2017 deaths
American audio engineers
People from Los Angeles
Best Sound BAFTA Award winners
Best Sound Mixing Academy Award winners
CAS Career Achievement Award honorees
Accidental deaths from falls
Accidental deaths in Florida